Bromoethane, also known as ethyl bromide, is a chemical compound of the haloalkanes group. It is abbreviated by chemists as EtBr (which is also used as an abbreviation for ethidium bromide).  This volatile compound has an ether-like odor.

Preparation
The preparation of EtBr stands as a model for the synthesis of bromoalkanes in general. It is usually prepared by the addition of hydrogen bromide to ethene:
H2C=CH2 + HBr → H3C-CH2Br

Bromoethane is inexpensive and would rarely be prepared in the laboratory. A laboratory synthesis includes reacting ethanol with a mixture of hydrobromic and sulfuric acids. An alternate route involves refluxing ethanol with phosphorus and bromine; phosphorus tribromide is generated in situ.

Uses
In organic synthesis, EtBr is the synthetic equivalent of the ethyl carbocation (Et+) synthon. In reality, such a cation is not actually formed.  For example, carboxylates salts are converted to ethyl esters, carbanions to ethylated derivatives, thiourea into ethylisothiouronium salts, and amines into ethylamines.

Safety
Short chain monohalocarbons in general are potentially dangerous alkylating agents. Bromides are better alkylating agents than chlorides, thus exposure to them should be minimized. EtBr is classified by the State of California as carcinogenic and a reproductive toxin.

References

External links
 International Chemical Safety Card 1378
 NIOSH Pocket Guide to Chemical Hazards
 IARC Monograph: "Bromoethane"

Bromoalkanes
Ethylating agents
IARC Group 3 carcinogens